Lakshamilavan, also spelled Lakshami Lavan (3 July 1899 – 29 August 1961), née Princess Wanphimon Worawan, was a Thai writer and a member of the Thai royal family. She was a royal consort of King Vajiravudh (Rama VI) of Siam. Her father was Worawannakon, Prince Narathip Praphanphong, a well-accepted poet and artist of the day.

Early life and marriage
Princess Lakshamilavan was born at the Worawan Palace, on 3 July 1899, the only daughter of Worawannakon, Prince Narathip Praphanphong and Mom Luang (The Honourable) Tat Montrikul, and best known in the palace by her nickname of "Tew". Her elder half-sister, Princess Vallabha Devi (also spelled Warnrabhathewee), ex-fiancée of King Vajiravudh.

She was initially named Wanphimon, and changed to Lakshamilavan, in 1920 by upon order of King Vajiravudh. and the same year, Princess Vallabha Devi, her half-sister engaged to King Vajiravudh. However, four months later in 1921, Vajiravudh nullified the engagement and pursued Princess Vallabha's sister, Princess Lakshamilavan, whom he engaged, but the marriage was never held and the couple then separated, because King Vajiravudh married Prueng Sucharitakul on 27 October 1921.

On 27 August 1922, the king elevated her to Princess Consort, to console her. Later Lakshamilavan separated her residence from her husband and her family, she always said "I don't care".

Life after the king's death 

After the king's death in 1925, she received an inheritance. She began writing novels under pen name, Patthama,  Wanphimon and Phra Nang Thoe Lakshamilavan. After World War II, she moved to Lakshami Vilas Villa to spend time writing novels.

Assassination
On the evening of 29 August 1961, Lakshamilavan was struck murdered by two men. Sa-ngiam "Saeng" Homchan and Charoen Kanchanaphai, were former Lakshami's gardeners, endeavoring to steal the wealth left to her by the king, repeatedly struck her across the head using a crowbar, while she was gardening. Lakshami's dead body was found near a garage at the villa five days after the attack. The murderer attempted to pawn the decorations he had stolen from the princess, unaware of the items' special value. The pawnshop owner, having recognized the valuables as royal property, informed the police.

Writings 
 Yua Rak (ยั่วรัก)
 Chiwit Wam (ชีวิตหวาม)
 Sueam Siang Sap (เสื่อมเสียงสาป)
 Rak Rangkae (รักรังแก)
 Sonthe Saneha (สนเท่ห์สเน่หา)
 Chok Chueam Chiwit (โชคเชื่อมชีวิต)
 Ruean Chai Thi Rai Kha (เรือนใจที่ไร้ค่า)
 Phai Rak Khong Chanchala (ภัยรักของจันจลา)

Ancestry

References

 

1899 births
1961 deaths
19th-century Thai women
19th-century Chakri dynasty
20th-century Thai women
20th-century Chakri dynasty
Thai princesses consort
Thai female Mom Chao
Thai translators
Murdered royalty
Assassinated Thai people
Dames Grand Cross of the Order of Chula Chom Klao
Deaths by blade weapons
Vorawan family
Thai female Phra Ong Chao
20th-century translators